is a trans-Neptunian object and binary system of the Kuiper belt, located in the outermost region of the Solar System. The cubewano was discovered at the Mauna Kea Observatories on 27 July 2001, by JJ Kavelaars, Jean-Marc Petit, Brett Gladman, and Matthew Holman. Later in 2001, Kavelaars discovered that it is a binary system.

In 2008, work was published showing that the binary has an extraordinarily long orbital period (for a binary trans-Neptunian object, asteroid or minor planet) of about 17 years. The orbital radius is also remarkably high (105,000 to 135,000 km) while the eccentricity is unusually low (< 0.4). All of these parameters are in the extremes of their normal ranges for such objects. The wide spacing and low eccentricity conspire to make the system prone to disruption, and its lifetime is estimated to be in the order of another billion years.

References

External links 
 The Extreme Kuiper Belt Binary , Isaac Newton Group of Telescopes, 13 December 2010
 Trans-Neptunian Binaries and the History of the Outer Solar System, Gemini Observatory, 22 August 2011 
 A Highly-split Kuiper Belt Pair, Gemini Observatory, 28 October 2008
 Kuiper belt pair sets record for long-distance relationship, New Scientist, 16 October 2008
 

Minor planet object articles (unnumbered)

20010727